The Sony Xperia PRO is an Android smartphone manufactured by Sony Mobile. It is exclusive to the United States, Japan, and Europe, and is intended as a phone for video professionals, offering HDMI input and mmWave 5G connectivity.

Specifications

Hardware
The Xperia PRO is powered by the Qualcomm Snapdragon 865 and the Adreno 650 GPU, and has 12 GB of RAM and 512 GB of UFS 3.0 internal storage (which can be expanded up to 1 TB via the microSDXC card slot), as well as one nano SIM slot. The display is a 6.5-inch 4K OLED with an ultrawide 21:9 aspect ratio that supports HDR BT.2020 and is capable of displaying one billion colors. The battery capacity is 4000 mAh, and offers 21 W fast charging over USB-C, but does not support wireless charging. There are front-facing stereo speakers and a 3.5 mm audio jack. The Xperia PRO has a micro-HDMI port, which enables it to be used as a camera field monitor via the External Monitor app, or stream live video directly to YouTube from an external camera. The phone also has an additional Network Visualizer app displaying upload and download speeds in real time.

Camera 
The Xperia PRO's camera setup is identical to the Xperia 1 II, with three rear-facing 12 MP sensors and a 3D iToF sensor, as well as a front-facing 8 MP sensor. The rear cameras comprise the main lens (24 mm f/1.7), the ultra wide angle lens (16 mm f/2.2), and the telephoto lens (70 mm f/2.4); each uses ZEISS' T✻ (T-Star) anti-reflective coating. The phone has support for 4K video recording for up to 60 FPS and for 1080p for up to 120 FPS.

Software
The Xperia PRO runs on Android 10. Sony has also paired the phone's camera tech with a "Pro" mode developed by Sony's camera division CineAlta, whose features take after Sony's Alpha camera lineup.

References

Android (operating system) devices
Sony smartphones
Mobile phones introduced in 2020
Mobile phones with multiple rear cameras
Mobile phones with 4K video recording